Wapi Pathum is a district (amphoe) of Maha Sarakham province, northeastern Thailand.

Geography
Neighbouring districts are (from the south clockwise): Na Dun, Na Chueak, Borabue, Mueang Maha Sarakham, and Kae Dam of Maha Sarakham Province; Si Somdet, Chaturaphak Phiman, Kaset Wisai, and Pathum Rat of Roi Et province.

History
The district dates back to Mueang Wapi Pathum, which was converted into a district around 1900.

Administration
The district is divided into 15 sub-districts (tambons), which are further subdivided into 240 villages (mubans). Nong Saeng is a sub-district municipality (thesaban tambon) which covers parts of tambon Nong Saeng. There are a further 15 tambon administrative organizations (TAO).

References

External links
amphoe.com (Thai)

Wapi Pathum